Steve McKenna (born August 21, 1973) is a Canadian former professional ice hockey player who played both defense and left wing. He was a veteran of eight seasons in the NHL. McKenna is currently a constable with the Waterloo Regional Police Service in Waterloo Region, Ontario.

Playing career
McKenna grew up playing minor hockey in his hometown of Hespeler, Ontario.  He played the majority of his minor hockey career for the Hespeler Shamrocks of the OMHA before playing Jr.B. for the Cambridge Winterhawks of the OHA in 1991-92.

The following season, McKenna headed west to play Tier II Jr.A. hockey for the Notre Dame Hounds in 1992-93.

After three seasons at Merrimack College, McKenna made his professional debut with the Phoenix Roadrunners of the International Hockey League in 1996.  He joined the Los Angeles Kings of the NHL during the 1996–97 season, appearing in nine games. He was an NHL left winger.

McKenna appeared in 137 games with the Kings over four seasons before entering the 2000 NHL Expansion Draft and being selected by the Minnesota Wild with the 37th overall pick.  After appearing in 20 games with the Wild, he was traded to the Pittsburgh Penguins on January 13, 2001, in exchange for Roman Simicek. McKenna joined the New York Rangers for the 2001–02 season before returning to the Penguins for the two seasons following that.

During the 2004–05 NHL lockout, there was a great demand for players like him so he played for the Nottingham Panthers of the Elite Ice Hockey League (Great Britain) and the Adelaide Avalanche of the AIHL (Australia).. In 2005–06, he joined Alleghe of the Italian Serie A and later in 2006, he played for Kangwon Land in the Asia League, giving him the rare distinction of playing on four different continents. McKenna played in the Asia League until the completion of the 2008-09 season, where he played for High1 from 2007–08 and the China Sharks in 2008-09. McKenna led all defensemen with eleven points, and briefly played with former NHL star Claude Lemieux before Lemieux returned to the Worcester Sharks.

McKenna finished his career with the CSK VVS Samara (ice hockey)(the Central Sports Club Of The Air Force, Samara) of the Russian Major League in 2009-10, scoring three points in ten games.

Coaching and later career
On August 16, 2006, Ice Hockey Australia announced that McKenna had been appointed as coach of the Mighty Roos, Australia's national team.  During his time with the Avalanche in the AIHL, McKenna "fell in love with  the Australian culture and climate and now wishes to make Australia his home." 

McKenna's official tenure as coach of the Mighty Roos started out in 2007, after McKenna completed his playing season with the Kangwonland. He will coach the team during their World Championships campaign that year.

McKenna coached Australia in to gaining a promotion to Division I during his first season at the helm of Mighty Roos.

McKenna was the head coach of HC Alleghe, a Serie A1 hockey team from 2009 until 2012. He later became the general manager of HC Alleghe, holding the position during the 2012-13 season.

McKenna subsequently became a Waterloo Regional Police Service constable.

Covid-19 vaccination protest
In October, 2021, McKenna publicly requested that the city of Cambridge remove his jersey from display in the Hespeler arena because of Ontario's policy of barring people who were not vaccinated against COVID-19 to enter municipal recreation facilities.  McKenna had previously donated his Los Angeles Kings team jersey to the arena.  Said McKenna, "I can’t enter the very arena where my jersey hangs on the wall."

Career statistics

Regular season and playoffs

References

External links

"San Jose strengthens ties to China Sharks" nhl.com, Aug 20, 2008
"New-look Anyang Halla adds western flavor" nhl.com, July 31, 2008*

1973 births
Living people
Adelaide Avalanche players
HC Alleghe players
Canadian ice hockey defencemen
China Dragon players
HC CSK VVS Samara players
Fredericton Canadiens players
Hartford Wolf Pack players
High1 players
Los Angeles Kings players
Merrimack Warriors men's ice hockey players
Minnesota Wild players
New York Rangers players
Notre Dame Hounds players
Nottingham Panthers players
Phoenix Roadrunners (IHL) players
Pittsburgh Penguins players
Ice hockey people from Toronto
Sportspeople from Cambridge, Ontario
Undrafted National Hockey League players
Canadian expatriate ice hockey players in England
Canadian expatriate ice hockey players in Italy
Canadian expatriate ice hockey players in China
Canadian expatriate ice hockey players in Russia